State Route 169 (SR 169) is a  state highway that serves as a north-south connection between Opelika and Seale through Lee and Russell Counties. SR 169 intersects US 431 at its southern terminus and SR 51 at its northern terminus.

Route description
SR 169 begins at its intersection with US 431 in Seale. From this point SR 169 travels in a northerly direction en route to US 80, where its shares a  concurrency with it before resuming its northwesterly track. SR 169 reaches its northern terminus at SR 51 in southern Opelika.

Major intersections

See also

References

External links

169
Transportation in Lee County, Alabama
Transportation in Russell County, Alabama